Hitoshi Tamura (多村 仁志, born March 28, 1977) is a retired Japanese professional baseball player who last played with the Chunichi Dragons in Japan's Nippon Professional Baseball.

Following his release from the Yokohama DeNA Baystars in 2015, Tamura joined the Chunichi Dragons on a trainee contract with the hope of returning to professional baseball.

On 1 October 2016 it was announced that Tamura was deemed surplus to requirements by the Dragons management. He then announced his retirement from professional baseball.

External links

NPB.com

References

1977 births
Living people
Baseball people from Kanagawa Prefecture
Japanese baseball players
Nippon Professional Baseball outfielders
Yokohama BayStars players
Fukuoka SoftBank Hawks players
Yokohama DeNA BayStars players
Chunichi Dragons players
2006 World Baseball Classic players